Igacovirus is a subgenus of viruses in the genus Gammacoronavirus.

Species
The genus consists of the following three species:

 Avian coronavirus
 Avian coronavirus 9203
 Duck coronavirus 2714

References

Virus subgenera
Gammacoronaviruses